Samuel Bronston (March 26, 1908 – January 12, 1994) was a Bessarabian-born American film producer, film director, and a nephew of socialist revolutionary figure, Leon Trotsky. He was also the petitioner in a U.S. Supreme Court case that set a major precedent for perjury prosecutions when it overturned his conviction.

Biography 
Bronston was born in Kishinev, Bessarabia, Russian Empire (present day Moldova) and educated at the Sorbonne.

He worked for Metro-Goldwyn-Mayer's French unit in Paris before setting up as an independent film producer by the 1940s.

Early films
Bronston produced two films for Columbia Pictures The Adventures of Martin Eden (1942) and City Without Men (1943).
 
His first film for his new production company, Samuel Bronston Productions, was Jack London, (1943) for United Artists followed by City Without Men (1943). He was to produce A Walk in the Sun, but when United Artists ceased funding of the film so as not to compete with The Story of G.I. Joe, the property was taken over by Lewis Milestone with the film released by 20th Century Fox. Bronston later successfully won a settlement for a percentage of rights to the film.

Epics

He was a pioneer in the practice of locating epic-scale productions in Spain to reduce the massive costs involved and using frozen funds. He had success with his series of epic films: John Paul Jones (1959), King of Kings (1961), El Cid (1961), 55 Days at Peking (1963) and The Fall of the Roman Empire (1964).

In 1962, he was awarded a Special Merit Golden Globe Award for El Cid that inspired him to help build gigantic studios in Las Rozas near Madrid.

Bronston frequently worked with a regular team of creative artists: the director Anthony Mann, the screenwriters Philip Yordan and Jesse Lasky Jr., composers Dimitri Tiomkin and Miklós Rózsa, the co-producers Jaime Prades, Alan Brown and Michał Waszyński, the cinematographer Robert Krasker and film editor Robert Lawrence. He also favoured Charlton Heston and Sophia Loren as his leading actors.

Accusations of corruption and last years 
The cost of the construction of the film studios and the box-office failure of his last epic, The Fall of the Roman Empire combined to leave Bronston in financial difficulties and, in 1964, he had to stop all business activities. Samuel Bronston Productions filed for Chapter 11 bankruptcy on June 5, 1964 stating he owed a debt of $5,647,758 to his creditor Pierre S. du Pont.  His company declared bankruptcy in June of that year.  A petition in August 1964 stated Bronston Distributors, Inc. (a separate company) owed Paramount $6,750,000 and Pierre S. Du Point $323,191.

Two years later, he was asked under oath by a lawyer for one of his creditors a series of questions about the many bank accounts the company had had in Europe. One of them concerned whether he had had an account in Switzerland. "The company had an account in Zürich for six months", he replied, and answered all other questions concerning Swiss bank accounts in the negative.

Later, it was discovered that he had indeed had a very active personal bank account in Geneva during the years he had been producing films in Europe. He was convicted of perjury by federal prosecutors who argued that his answer, while truthful in and of itself, was intended to mislead or evade. After the appeals court upheld the conviction, Bronston v. United States reached the Supreme Court, which overturned the conviction on January 10, 1973. Its ruling, that literally truthful yet technically misleading answers cannot be prosecuted as perjury, has formed an important part of jurisprudence on the matter ever since, even being invoked by President Bill Clinton's attorneys when he was charged with perjury during his impeachment.

The bankruptcy and criminal prosecution devastated his film career. He had completed the 1964 Circus World with John Wayne just before the bankruptcy, and after that he made only three films: Savage Pampas (1966), filmed in Spain with Robert Taylor; Dr. Coppelius (1966); and Fort Saganne (1984), a French film with Gérard Depardieu and Catherine Deneuve. A planned epic on the life of Isabella of Spain never materialized.

Bronston died in 1994 of pneumonia secondary to Alzheimer's disease at Mercy Hospital in Sacramento, California.  He is buried in Las Rozas, Madrid, Spain. He was survived by five children: Dr William Bronston, Irene Bronston, Andrea Bronston, Philip Bronston and Kira Bronston.

Filmography
 The Adventures of Martin Eden (1942)
 City Without Men (1943)
 Jack London (1943)
 A Walk in the Sun (1945)
 John Paul Jones (1959)
 King of Kings (1961)
 El Cid (1961)
 55 Days at Peking (1963)
 The Fall of the Roman Empire (1964)
 Circus World (1964)
 Savage Pampas (1966)
 Dr. Coppelius (1966)
Brigham (1977)
 Fort Saganne (1984)

References

”Bronston Film Productions Files Bankruptcy Petition", New York Times, June 6, 1944 p. 15.
"Business Records", New York Times, August 6, 1965, p. 32.
Lyons, Richard D. "Samuel Bronston, Film Producer, 85", New York Times, January 15, 1994, p. 28
Salute to the Romanian Jews in America and Canada, 1850-2010

External links

The Hollywood Art, March 2, 2008: Samuel Bronston's Vanishing Empires Linked 2012-10-11
The Independent, 20 January 1994: Obituary: Samuel Bronston Linked 2012-10-11

1908 births
1994 deaths
Film people from Chișinău
People from Kishinyovsky Uyezd
Moldovan Jews
American people of Moldovan-Jewish descent
American film producers
20th-century American businesspeople
University of Paris alumni
Soviet expatriates in France
Soviet emigrants to the United States
People with Alzheimer's disease
Deaths from pneumonia in California